The Ministry of Jules de Polignac was formed on 8 August 1829 in the last year of the reign of King Charles X of France. It was dissolved on 29 July 1830 during the July Revolution and replaced by the Ministry of Casimir de Rochechouart de Mortemart.

Ministers

Jules de Polignac countersigned the ordinance of 8 August 1829 that named the ministers, but was not formally made president of the council of ministers until 17 November 1829.
The ministers were:

Changes
On 18 November 1829:

On 23 August 1829:

On 19 May 1830:

References
Citations

Sources

French governments
1829 establishments in France
1830 disestablishments in France
Cabinets established in 1829
Cabinets disestablished in 1830